Veeva Systems Inc. is an American cloud-computing company focused on pharmaceutical and life sciences industry applications. Headquartered in Pleasanton, California, it was founded in 2007 by Peter Gassner and Matt Wallach. It works with software as a service (SaaS) in the life-science industry.

The company went public in 2013. As of May 5, 2022, it has a market capitalization of US$27.5 billion.

On February 1, 2021, Veeva became a  public benefit corporation. This made it the first publicly-traded company to convert to a public benefit corporation.

Acquisitions
In 2015, Veeva acquired Zinc Ahead, a content management software company.

In 2019, Veeva acquired Crossix, a privacy-safe patient data and analytics company.

In 2019, Veeva acquired Physicians World LLC, a pharmaceutical company that provides business process outsourcing services.

In 2021, Veeva acquired Learnaboutgmp LLC, which provides compliance training services for life sciences organizations.

References

External links

Software companies based in the San Francisco Bay Area
Software companies established in 2007
American companies established in 2007
2007 establishments in California
Companies based in Pleasanton, California
Cloud computing providers
2013 initial public offerings
Companies listed on the New York Stock Exchange
Software companies of the United States